One in Two – Two in One is a live album by American jazz drummer Max Roach and saxophonist Anthony Braxton recorded in 1979 for the Swiss Hathut label.

Reception
The Allmusic review by Scott Yanow awarded the album 5 stars, stating: "With Roach pushing Braxton, the results are quite adventurous, yet full of joy. Followers of avant-garde jazz can consider this set to be essential." All About Jazz reviewer Chris May noted: "This is music which demands the full attention of the listener to reveal all of its considerable beauty—but it's not "difficult" music. It's consistently melodic, and often, but not always, played with a fixed meter. It's subtle, it's layered and it's got depth. It's a blast."

Track listing
All compositions by Max Roach and Anthony Braxton
 "One in Two - Two in One Part 1" - 35:28 
 "One in Two - Two in One Part 2" - 39:30
Recorded at the Jazz Festival Willisau '79 in Willisau, Switzerland on August 31, 1979

Personnel
Anthony Braxton - alto saxophone, soprano saxophone, sopranino saxophone, contrabass clarinet, clarinet, flute
Max Roach - percussion, gongs, tuned cymbals

References

Hathut Records live albums
Max Roach live albums
Anthony Braxton live albums
1979 live albums